Kult ciała (The Cult of the Body) is a 1930 Polish film directed by Michał Waszyński. It is based on a novel by Mieczysław Srokowski and stars Victor Varconi.

Cast
Victor Varconi ...  Czesław (as Michał Victor Varconyi) 
Agnes Petersen-Mozżuchinowa ...  Hanka Złotopolska 
Fryderyk Delius ...  Baron Stanisław Stumberg 
Krystyna Ankwicz ...  Lina 
Eugeniusz Bodo ...  Franciszek 
Paweł Owerłło ...  Zahorski

External links 
 
 Kultu ciała at the Internet Polish Movie Database 

1930 films
1930s Polish-language films
Polish black-and-white films
Films directed by Michał Waszyński
1930 romantic drama films
Polish romantic drama films